Dalton Prejean (December 10, 1959 – May 18, 1990) was one of 22 people in the United States executed for crimes committed as a juvenile prior to the decision Roper v. Simmons in 2005. He was tried, convicted, and executed in the electric chair in Louisiana for the murder of Louisiana State Police Trooper Donald Cleveland.

The case received international attention because the defendant was a black man convicted by an all-white jury; had brain damage and tested just above mental retardation; and was age 17 at the time of the crime.

Prejean's son, Dalton Prejean Jr., born while his father was awaiting execution, was himself convicted of the 2001 death of a 14-month old baby. Prejean Jr. is currently serving a 60-year sentence in the same prison his father was executed in.

Background
Prejean was the second of four children. When he was two weeks old his parents sent him from their home in Lafayette to live with his aunt and uncle in Houston, Texas. Dalton was unaware of his true parentage until the age of eleven. When Dalton's father left his mother and moved to Houston, the aunt decided that Dalton had to be told that he was not her child. Around this time, he began creating problems of an unknown nature, and was sent to live with his mother in Lafayette.

Dalton began skipping his school classes following his return to Lafayette. In March 1972, he was committed to the Louisiana Training Institute for truancy at the insistence of his mother. Released only seven months later, he soon came into conflict with the authorities on charges of burglary, theft, and "false firearms." In March 1974, he was committed to the Lafayette Juvenile Youth Authority, a residential program for delinquents. He ran away from that facility after a month; upon his return, his commitment was terminated and he was released on probation to his mother.

In June 1974, Dalton was arrested for the killing of John Doucet, a taxi driver. Dalton admitted the killing and was committed once again to the Louisiana Training Institute. In a later statement about the incident, Dalton stated that he and two friends called a cab with the intention of robbing the driver. One of his companions was carrying a gun. The three directed the driver to a quiet part of town and persuaded him to stop while they searched for an address. Dalton insisted on taking the gun from his companion because the other youth appeared to be nervous. Dalton approached the driver, and believing that the driver was reaching for a gun of his own, fired twice and began running. While fleeing, he told a passerby to call an ambulance because someone had been shot. Dalton later turned himself in to the police and admitted that he had killed the driver.

A psychiatric evaluation of Dalton was performed in 1974. He was found to be intellectually limited and to have very poor judgment. Dalton was diagnosed as having borderline mental retardation, and it was questionable if he knew the difference between right and wrong. The psychiatrist considered the boy to be "a definite danger to himself and others, and his dream content suggests that it is a matter of accident that the cab driver was killed rather than the boy being killed. He is equally likely to get himself killed in the near future." The psychiatrist therefore recommended a lengthy confinement, followed by transfer to permanent facilities. The juvenile courts had jurisdiction over the defendant until he was 21. The doctor's recommendation would have served to keep the defendant confined until December 1980.

In 1976, however, another doctor conducted a psychiatric evaluation of the defendant and recommended that he be discharged. He concluded that the defendant's values had changed, but cautioned that "suitable conditions (should be) imposed to be sure he had adequate supervision and is going to live in a fairly stable environment." That doctor also suggested that fairly rigid probation requirements be imposed. On December 10, 1976, Prejean was released to the custody of his aunt in Houston, apparently without any probation requirements. Within seven months, Dalton was once more under arrest for murder.

Crime 

At about five o'clock in the morning of July 2, 1977, Prejean, his brother Joseph, Michael George, and Michael Broussard left Roger's Nite Club in Lafayette Parish. The four had spent the night drinking in various lounges in the vicinity. They left Roger's Nite Club in a 1966 Chevrolet driven by Dalton, with his brother in the front seat and the other two in the back. The car's taillights were not working, and within a few hundred feet of the lounge, Trooper Cleveland, who was on his way to work driving his police vehicle, signaled the Chevrolet to stop. Prejean and his brother attempted to switch places in the front seat because the defendant had been driving without a license. The trooper noticed the switch and ordered the occupants out of the car. He told Michael George and Michael Broussard to get back in and began to search Joseph Prejean. Dalton Prejean, back in the car, stated in reaction to the trooper's pushing Joseph against the car, over Joseph's protest, "I don't like the way he's doing my brother." Dalton then took a .38 caliber revolver from under the car seat, got out of the car and approached the officer with the gun hidden against his leg. As he neared the trooper, he fired without warning. Trooper Cleveland was struck by two bullets and was killed. Dalton and his companions fled the scene but were apprehended several hours later.

Dalton was once again given psychological tests during pretrial confinement. On the basis of the Wechsler Intelligence Scale, the Stanford Binet Vocabulary Subtest and the Bender-Gestalt Test, Dr. William Hawkins determined that he functioned at the dull normal level in the verbal area, but in the borderline mental retardation area in the performance area. He had a verbal IQ of 82 and a performance IQ of 72. His full scale IQ is 76, with a full scale mental age of 13 years and six months.

Trial and appeals

Dalton Prejean was charged by grand jury indictment with first degree murder in violation of Louisiana Revised Statute 14:30. The trial was transferred from Lafayette Parish to Ouachita Parish because of pretrial publicity. After a three-day bifurcated trial beginning on May 1, 1978, a jury of twelve persons found the defendant guilty as charged and unanimously recommended that a death sentence be imposed. Prejean's defense lawyers appealed, citing mitigating factors of an IQ around 71, schizophrenia with two institutionalizations, and his abandonment as an infant.

The appeal reached the US Supreme Court in 1990; in November 1989 it had granted a stay on the eve of his scheduled execution. On April 17, 1990, the Court lifted the stay without comment. The European Parliament called for commutation of the sentence and a review of the evidence. A representative for Amnesty International said, "I doubt that in documented recent world history there is an execution [with] such a pile of reasons not to do it."

Louisiana Governor Buddy Roemer declined to commute the death sentence to life in prison, rejecting the recommendation of the parole board. "On behalf of 780 state troopers, and thousands of police officers who put their lives on the line every day, the execution will proceed."

Execution 

On May 18, 1990, Prejean was executed in the electric chair at Louisiana State Penitentiary at Angola.

His final statement was:

Nothing is going to be accomplished. I have peace with myself. I'd like to thank all of those who supported me all these years. I'd also like to thank my loved ones for being strong. . . . My son will be a better person for not letting something like this bring down his life. . . . Keep strong, keep pushing, keep praying. They said it wasn't for the revenge, but it's hard for me to see, to understand. I hope they're happy. So I forfeit my life. I give my love to all. God bless.

See also 
 Capital punishment for juveniles in the United States
 Capital punishment in Louisiana
 Capital punishment in the United States
 List of people executed in Louisiana
 Roper v. Simmons: 2005 U.S. Supreme Court ruling that the execution of those under 18 (at the time of committing the capital crime) is unconstitutional.
 Thompson v. Oklahoma: 1988 U.S. Supreme Court ruling that the execution of those who committed their crime when under the age of 16 is unconstitutional.

References

 State v. Prejean, 379 So.2d 240 (La., 1979.)

1959 births
1990 deaths
Minors convicted of murder
American male criminals
American people executed for murdering police officers
20th-century executions of American people
20th-century executions by Louisiana
People executed by Louisiana by electric chair
Executed African-American people
People convicted of murder by Louisiana
Juvenile offenders executed by the United States
People from Lafayette, Louisiana
People with schizophrenia
Executed people from Louisiana